Presidential primary elections were held in Uruguay on 28 June 2009 in order to nominate the presidential candidate for every political party.

Overview 
Three parties had several contenders:
 Broad Front
 José Mujica (Espacio 609, Communist Party of Uruguay (Partido Comunista del Uruguay), Corriente Acción y Pensamiento Libertad) – winner
 Danilo Astori (Uruguay Assembly (Asamblea Uruguay)), Alianza Progresista, Nuevo Espacio (New Space), Socialist Party of Uruguay (Partido Socialista)
 Marcos Carámbula (Vertiente Artiguista (Artiguistan Slope))
 National Party
 Luis Alberto Lacalle (Unidad Nacional, Soplan Vientos Nuevos) – winner
 Jorge Larrañaga (Alianza Nacional (National Alliance of Uruguay), Civic Union)
 Irineu Riet Correa
 Colorado Party
 Pedro Bordaberry (Vamos Uruguay (Let's Go, Uruguay)) – winner
 José Amorín (Batllismo Siglo XXI)
 Luis Hierro López (Foro Batllista)
 Daniel Lamas
 Independent Party
 Pablo Mieres
 Popular Assembly
 Raúl Rodríguez

References

External links

2009
2009 elections in South America
2009 in Uruguay
June 2009 events in South America
José Mujica